Cedar–Riverside is a light rail station on the METRO Blue Line in Minneapolis, Minnesota.

The station is located between 15th and 16th Avenues South, near the interchange of Interstate 35W, Interstate 94, and Minnesota State Highway 55. It is a center-platform station, and is one of a few stations where there are no designated bus routes to transfer to or from, though buses run along Cedar Avenue a few blocks away. Service began at this station when the Blue Line opened on June 26, 2004.

As light rail vehicles are removed from service following the rush hour peak, the Cedar–Riverside station is the last stop for the trains and all passengers must disembark at that point. The maintenance base for the line is located between this station and the Franklin Avenue stop to the south.

The transparent roof of the station has constellations marked on it.

Notable places nearby
 Cedar-Riverside Neighborhood
Currie Park
Hiawatha LRT Trail
Samatar Crossing
West Bank of the University of Minnesota (5-6 blocks)

External links 
Metro Transit: Cedar-Riverside Station

Metro Blue Line (Minnesota) stations in Minneapolis
Railway stations in the United States opened in 2004
2004 establishments in Minnesota